The Alabama Wing Civil Air Patrol (ALWG) is one of 52 wings (50 states, Puerto Rico, and Washington, D.C.) in Civil Air Patrol (the official United States Air Force Auxiliary).

Mission
Civil Air Patrol has three missions: providing emergency services; offering cadet programs for youth; and providing aerospace education for both CAP members and the general public.

Emergency Services
CAP actively provides emergency services, includes search and rescue and disaster relief operations, as well as assisting in the providing of humanitarian aid.

Members of Alabama Wing have practiced their ability to find downed planes by running a drill in which pilots searched from the air for practice beacons, and ground teams were then dispatched to the proper location.

CAP also provides Air Force support through conducting light transport, communications support, and low-altitude route surveys. Civil Air Patrol can also offer support to counter-drug missions.

Cadet Programs
CAP offers cadet programs for youth aged 12 to 21, which includes providing aerospace education, leadership training, physical fitness and moral leadership to cadets.

Aerospace Education
CAP provides aerospace education for both CAP members and the general public. Fulfilling the education component of the overall CAP mission includes training members of CAP, offering workshops for youth throughout the nation through schools, and providing education through public aviation events.

Organization

Legal protection
Civil Air Patrol members who are employed within the borders of Alabama are entitled to military leave of absence from their employment "without loss of pay, time, efficiency rating, annual vacation, or sick leave" under the Code of Alabama § 31-2-13 when training or other service related to Civil Air Patrol.

See also
1st Air Force
Civil Air Patrol
History of Civil Air Patrol

References

External links
Headquarters - Alabama Wing Civil Air Patrol Official Website
Headquarters - Southeast Region Civil Air Patrol Official Website
Civil Air Patrol Official Website
Alabama Wing Civil Air Patrol Facebook Group

Wings of the Civil Air Patrol
Education in Alabama
Military in Alabama